Cheiridopsis pillansii is a species of plant in the genus Cheiridopsis native to South Africa. It is a low-growing succulent with pairs of small, cushion-like leaves that are pale green to purple in color.

References 

pillansii
Taxa named by Louisa Bolus